The 1940 Marquette Hilltoppers football team was an American football team that represented Marquette University as an independent during the 1940 college football season. In its fourth and final season under head coach Paddy Driscoll, the team compiled a 4–4 record and outscored opponents by a total of 99 to 95. The team played its home games at Marquette Stadium in Milwaukee.

On November 23, 1940, with two games remaining on the schedule, Marquette announced that Paddy Driscoll's resignation as coach had been received and accepted. In announcing the resignation, the university stated: "This action was taken for personal reasons, independent of any winning or losing record." Driscoll compiled a 10–23–1 in four years as Marquette's coach.

Schedule

References

Marquette
Marquette Golden Avalanche football seasons
Marquette Hilltoppers football